Leo Carlin (born September 16, 1937) is a former businessman who was the Philadelphia Eagles ticket manager for 53 years. He was first a part-time ticket office employee in 1960. His first year was the year the Eagles won the 1960 NFL Championship. He was promoted to be the ticket manager in 1964. He remained the manager until 1983, when he got a job as the ticket manager for the Philadelphia Stars of the USFL. He returned to the Eagles in 1985. In 2007, he was a nominee for the Pro Football Hall of Fame as a pioneer in the sports ticket industry. He was inducted into the Philadelphia Eagles Hall of Fame in 2012. He retired in 2015 after 55 years in the sports ticket industry.

References

Further reading

Living people
1937 births
People from Philadelphia